Carlos Rosado Vallejo (born 8 September 1975) is a Mexican former wide receiver in American football who played in NFL Europe for the Barcelona Dragons and the Amsterdam Admirals from 1998 through 2004. He also played preseason with the New York Jets during 2003.

His father, Carlos Rosado Stevens, was a wide receiver for the Águilas Reales de UNAM from 1970 to 1974, and later served as the president of ONEFA, the Mexican college football league, from 2008 to 2011. The younger Rosado began playing the sport at the age of seven. He played college football for the Aztecas UDLAP, winning three consecutive ONEFA national championships between 1995 and 1997. He also earned his degree in business administration.

Coming out of college, Rosado joined the Barcelona Dragons of NFL Europe in 1998 after a pair of successful tryouts. He played seven seasons in the league, becoming the second Mexican national to play in the league. He was named the National (non-American) offensive player of the year in 2003. Rosado was invited to training camp by the New York Jets in 2003, but did not make the final roster.

Post-playing career
Rosado worked as a talent scout for the NFL from 2005 to 2009.

On 1 April 2008, he was named the new Commissioner of ONEFA. He has also worked as color analyst for Fox Sports and has a sportswear shop. In 2010, Rosado was named the athletic director at his alma mater.

Rosado was hired as offensive coordinator of the Dinos de Saltillo of the Liga de Fútbol Americano Profesional (LFA) in 2020, having previously served as the team's wide receivers coach.

References

External links
 Carlos Rosado at ProFootballArchives

1975 births
Living people
Sportspeople from Mexico City
Mexican players of American football
American football wide receivers
Barcelona Dragons players
Amsterdam Admirals players
New York Jets players
Expatriate players of American football
Mexican expatriate sportspeople in Spain
Mexican expatriate sportspeople in the Netherlands
Mexican expatriate sportspeople in the United States
Aztecas UDLAP players